
Many species of North American landbird have been recorded in Great Britain as vagrants. Most occur in autumn; southwest England attracts the greatest proportion, but northern and western Scotland comes a close second. Occasionally birds overwinter, and some species (e.g. Baltimore oriole) are more prone to this than others. Vagrancy also occurs in spring, and some species (e.g. white-throated sparrow and dark-eyed junco) do in fact have more records at this time than in autumn. Weather systems are thought to be the primary reason for the occurrence of birds in autumn; some birds seen in spring may simply be overshoots, although ship-assistance may also play a part.

Species list
The following species have been recorded, and accepted as wild by the British Ornithologists' Union Records Committee:

 American kestrel
 Mourning dove
 Yellow-billed cuckoo
 Black-billed cuckoo
 Common nighthawk
 Chimney swift
 Belted kingfisher
 Yellow-bellied sapsucker
 Purple martin
 Cliff swallow
 Tree swallow
 Buff-bellied pipit
 Cedar waxwing
 Grey catbird
 Northern mockingbird
 Brown thrasher
 American robin
 Varied thrush
 Veery
 Grey-cheeked thrush
 Swainson's thrush
 Hermit thrush
 Wood thrush
 Scarlet tanager
 Summer tanager
 Red-eyed vireo
 Philadelphia vireo
 Yellow-throated vireo
 Eastern towhee
 Lark sparrow
 Song sparrow
 White-crowned sparrow
 White-throated sparrow
 Dark-eyed junco
 Rose-breasted grosbeak
 Indigo bunting
 Savannah sparrow
 Golden-winged warbler
 Tennessee warbler
 Northern parula
 Yellow warbler
 Chestnut-sided warbler
 Magnolia warbler
 Cape May warbler
 Yellow-rumped warbler
 Blackburnian warbler
 Bay-breasted warbler
 Blackpoll warbler
 Black-and-white warbler
 American redstart
 Ovenbird
 Northern waterthrush
 Common yellowthroat
 Hooded warbler
 Wilson's warbler
 Evening grosbeak
 Baltimore oriole
 Brown-headed cowbird
 Bobolink

Controversial species
The following species have been recorded, but not accepted as wild:

 Yellow-headed blackbird

See also
 North American waterfowl in Britain
 North American shorebirds in Britain
 North American gulls and terns in Britain

References
To be completed

Ornithology in the United Kingdom
Birds in the United Kingdom